The Ministry for Business Development is a new Government of Ghana ministry created to promote the private sector in Ghana. The ministry was created under the Nana Akuffo-Addo administration in 2017. The ministry is headed by Ibrahim Mohammed Awal.

References

Ministries and Agencies of State of Ghana